Caroline Anne Ross is a British physicist and professor at the Massachusetts Institute of Technology who was named as a Fellow of the American Physical Society in 2004 for innovative research into the magnetic properties of thin film and nanoscale structures, and for the development of novel lithographic and self-assembly methods for nanostructure fabrication and named Fellow of the Institute of Electrical and Electronics Engineers (IEEE) in 2013 for contributions to synthesis and characterization of nanoscale structures and films for magnetic and magneto-optical devices. She is the Associate Head of the Department of Materials Science and Engineering at MIT.

Early life and education 
Ross was born in London, England. She received her B.A. in Materials Science from Cambridge University in 1985 and her PhD in Materials Science from Cambridge University in 1988. After a postdoc at Harvard University, she became a research engineer at Komag Inc, a manufacturer of hard disks from 1991 to 1997.

Awards 
 2004 named APS Fellow - For innovative research into the magnetic properties of thin film and nanoscale structures, and for the development of novel lithographic and self-assembly methods for nanostructure fabrication.
 2013 named IEEE Fellow - For contributions to synthesis and characterization of nanoscale structures and films for magnetic and magneto-optical devices.

References 

Fellow Members of the IEEE
Living people
MIT School of Engineering faculty
Alumni of the University of Cambridge
Year of birth missing (living people)
Fellows of the American Physical Society
British electrical engineers
Women electrical engineers
20th-century British engineers
20th-century women engineers
20th-century British physicists
20th-century British women scientists
21st-century British engineers
21st-century women engineers
21st-century British physicists
21st-century British women scientists
British women physicists
Scientists from London